Petra Zrimšek (born 19 May 1988) is a road cyclist from Slovenia. She participated at the 2012 UCI Road World Championships.

References

External links
 profile at Procyclingstats.com

1988 births
Slovenian female cyclists
Living people